Henley Women's Regatta, often abbreviated to "HWR" or "Women's Henley", is a rowing regatta held at Henley-on-Thames, England. Chris Aistrop and Rosemary Mayglothling were jointly responsible for setting up the Regatta in June 1988 and Aistrop was the first chairman.

It was first held in 1988, as a response to the absence of women's events at Henley Royal Regatta at that time.  While Henley Royal Regatta now offers eight women's events, Women's Henley has continued to build and expand. Henley Women's Regatta now lasts three full days, and includes time trials for over-subscribed events.

Henley Women's Regatta is held on the Thames River at Henley, using the same, but shortened, boomed course as Henley Royal (the shorter course is due to Environment Agency safety restrictions and the short intervals between races at HWR).  The Henley Women's Regatta course runs for 1,500m in comparison with Henley Royal's 2112m.  The Henley Women's Regatta course begins at the top of Temple Island and has its finish line in front of the Remenham Club, where the Friends of Henley Women's Regatta enclosure (the 'Chairman's Enclosure') is located. It takes place over a Friday, Saturday and Sunday in mid to late June.

In 2004 the regatta has offered Intermediate, Senior and Elite categories instead of college, Club and Open. Junior categories are also offered.  In 2011 the regatta also began to offer Adaptive events.
On 1 December 2017 HWR announced that the Competition Structure events would be altered for the 2018 regatta to recategorise the events into Championship, Aspirational, Development, Junior, Junior under 16, and Para Rowing. The 2021 Regatta is due to take place from Friday 2nd to Sunday 4 July.

The current regatta chair is Miriam Batten and the joint patrons of the regatta are Sir Steven Redgrave and Lady Redgrave.

Events

On 1 December 2017 HWR announced that the competition structure would be altered for 2018 as follows:

Championship
The Ron Needs Cup (Eights)
The Avril Vellacott Cup (Coxless Fours)
The Borne Cup (Quad Sculls)
The Redgrave Vase (Coxless Pairs)
The W. Peer Cup (Double Sculls)
The George Innes Cup (Single Sculls)
The Haslam Trophy (Lwt Double Sculls)
The Parkside Trophy (Lwt Coxless Pairs)
The Godfrey Rowsports Trophy (Lwt Single Sculls) 
Aspirational
The Colgan Foundation Cup (Academic Eights)
The Invesco Perpetual Challenge Cup (Club Eights)
The Cathy Cruickshank Trophy (Academic Coxless Fours)
The Lester Trophy (Club Coxless Fours)
The Chairman's Trophy (Quad Sculls)
The Rosie Mayglothling Trophy (Double Sculls)
The Bernard Churcher Trophy (Single Sculls)
The Fiona Dennis Trophy (Lwt Single Sculls)
Development
The Frank V Harry Cup (Coxed Fours)
Junior
The Peabody Cup (Eights)
The Groton School Challenge Cup (Coxed Fours)
The Bea Langridge Trophy (Quad Sculls)
The Rayner Cup  (Double Sculls)
The Di Ellis Trophy (Single Sculls)
Junior under 16
The Nina Padwick Trophy (J16 Quad Sculls)
The West End Amateur Rowing Association Trophy (J16 Coxed Fours)
Para Rowing
The Grosvenor Cup (Para-Rowing Single Sculls)

See also
Henley Royal Regatta
Henley Boat Races
Rowing on the River Thames

References

External links
 Henley Women's Regatta

Women's rowing in the United Kingdom
Sport in Oxfordshire
Women's Regatta
Regattas on the River Thames
Women's sports competitions in England
1988 establishments in England
Recurring events established in 1988